Italy competed at the 2020 Summer Olympics in Tokyo. Originally scheduled to take place from 24 July to 9 August 2020, the Games were postponed to 23 July to 8 August 2021, because of the COVID-19 pandemic. Italian athletes have appeared in every Summer Olympics edition of the modern era, with the disputed exception of the 1904 Summer Olympics in St. Louis where one Italian may have participated.

The Italian National Olympic Committee will reward the gold medalists with €180,000, the silver medalists with €90,000 and the bronze medalists with €60,000.

Italy competed in all sports except badminton, field hockey, football, handball and rugby sevens.

Italy has ended the 2020 Summer Olympics winning 10 gold, 10 silver and 20 bronze medals, setting a new record in number of medals won (36 medals was first reached in the Los Angeles Olympics of 1932, and then again in the Rome Olympics of 1960). Moreover, for the first time the country has received at least one medal in each day.

Medalists

| width="78%" align="left" valign="top" |

| width="22%" align="left" valign="top" |

| width="22%" align="left" valign="top" |

Competitors
The following is the list of number of competitors in the Games. Note that reserves in athletics (alternate) are not counted:

Notable moments

Historical records in 2021
 On July 30, Lucilla Boari became the first Italian woman to win an Olympic medal in archery, winning the bronze medal in the women's individual.
 On July 31, Irma Testa became the first Italian woman to win an Olympic medal in boxing, ending with a bronze in the women's featherweight.
 On August 1, Marcell Jacobs became the first Italian to compete in the 100 metres final and to win the gold medal, with a time of 9.80 seconds, setting a new record for Italian team after 121 years from the first participation in this Olympic discipline.
 On August 1, Thomas Ceccon, Nicolò Martinenghi, Federico Burdisso and Alessandro Miressi got on podium winning the bronze medal in Men's 4 × 100 metre medley relay, setting the first time an Italian Team's swimmer succeeded in winning an Olympic medal in that event. Previously, on July 26, both Ceccon and Miressi, along with Lorenzo Zazzeri and Manuel Frigo, succeeded in winning the first Olympic medal for the Italian team in the Men's 4 × 100 metre freestyle relay, ending with a silver medal.
 On August 1, the high jumper Gianmarco Tamberi became the first Italian man to be on podium of Men's high jump, winning a joint gold medal with Qatar athlete Mutaz Essa Barshim. Overall, he is the second Italian athlete to win an Olympic medal in this sport after Sara Simeoni who won 1 gold and 2 silver medals respectively at the Moscow 1980 (gold), Montreal 1976 (first silver) and Los Angeles 1984 (second silver). Moreover, both Tamberi and Barshim agreed to share the gold medal, after a nail-biting tie between both of them as they cleared 2.37m with identical paths, in a rare instance where the athletes of different nations agreed to share the same medal in the history of Olympics. Barshim in particular was quoted in his postmatch presentation asking, "Can we have two golds?", representing one of the Olympic's most memorable moment ever.
 On August 2, the artistic gymnast Vanessa Ferrari succeeded in winning the silver medal in the women's floor, representing the first individual Olympic medal ever for a female Italian gymanst. It is also the first Olympic medal for Italian women gymnastics in 93 years, since Amsterdam 1928 when Italian Women Team won the silver medal in Women's all-around.
 On August 6, Italy reached and surpassed its own record for the highest number of Olympic medals won in a single edition. Such record of 36 medals was first reached in the Los Angeles Olympics of 1932, and then again in the Rome Olympics of 1960. Italy ended the Olympics with 40 medals. Moreover, for the first time the country has clinched at least one medal per day.
 After winning no medal at all in 2016, Italy reached its best Olympic performance ever in athletics, winning five gold medals (Gianmarco Tamberi in high jump, Lamont Marcell Jacobs in 100 metres, Massimo Stano and Antonella Palmisano in their respective 20 km racewalking events, and the 4x100 men relay).

Archery

One Italian archer qualified for the men's individual recurve by reaching the quarterfinal stage and obtaining one of the four available spots at the 2019 World Archery Championships in 's-Hertogenbosch, Netherlands. Another Italian archer secured a spot in the women's individual recurve by winning the mixed team title at the 2019 European Games in Minsk, Belarus. Meanwhile, three Italian archers qualified for the women's events by securing the last of three quota places available in the team recurve at the 2021 WA Final Qualification Tournament in Paris, France.

Artistic swimming

Italy fielded a squad of eight artistic swimmers to compete in both the women's team and duet routine  the 2021 FINA Olympic Qualification Tournament in Barcelona, Spain.

Athletics

On 28 June 2021, La Gazzetta dello Sport announced initially an Italian team of 72 (40 men and 32 women), the largest team ever in athletics. The official composition of the Italian team have been confirmed on 2 July and it reaches finally 76 athletes (41 men and 35 women) without alternate athletes. 2 more qualified athletes have been withdrawn after their qualification. It is the largest team ever, since Los Angeles 1984 (50).

Italian athletes further achieved the qualification, either by entry standard (qualifying time or mark) or by world ranking, in the following track and field events (up to a maximum of 3 athletes in each event).

All the 5 relay teams, also a record for Italy, are qualified by designated competition (5 athletes per each relay team and 4 athletes only, 2 men and 2 women, for the mixed team). The athletes already qualified for 100 m and 400 m shall be part of their respective relay teams.

Track & road events
Men

Women

Mixed

Field events
Men

Women

Basketball

Men's tournament 

At the 2020 FIBA Men's Olympic Qualifying Tournament, held in Belgrad, Serbia, Italy men's team qualified, beating Serbia 102 to 95 on 4 July 2021. It is the Italian return to Olympics after 17 years, Athens 2004.

Team roster

Group play

Quarterfinal

3×3 basketball
Summary

Women's tournament

Italy women's national 3x3 team qualified directly for the Olympics by winning the 2020 FIBA Universality Olympic Qualifying Tournament.

Team roster
Chiara Consolini
Rae Lin D'Alie
Marcella Filippi
Giulia Rulli

Group play

Quarterfinal

Boxing

Italy entered four female boxers into the Olympic tournament. Giordana Sorrentino (women's flyweight), Rio 2016 Olympian Irma Testa (women's featherweight), Rebecca Nicoli (women's lightweight), and 2019 world silver medalist Angela Carini (women's welterweight) secured the spots on the Italian squad in their respective weight divisions, either by winning the round of 16 match, advancing to the semifinal match, or scoring a box-off triumph, at the 2020 European Qualification Tournament in Villebon-sur-Yvette, France.

Canoeing

Slalom
Italian canoeists qualified one boat for each of the following classes through the 2019 ICF Canoe Slalom World Championships in La Seu d'Urgell, Spain. The slalom canoeists, highlighted by Rio 2016 Olympians Giovanni De Gennaro and Stefanie Horn were named to the Italian roster for the Games on June 22, 2021.

Sprint
Italian canoeists qualified two boats in each of the following distances for the Games through the 2019 ICF Canoe Sprint World Championships in Szeged, Hungary. The sprint canoeing team was named to the Italian roster for the Games on June 22, 2021, including Rio 2016 Olympian Manfredi Rizza.

Qualification Legend: FA = Qualify to final (medal); FB = Qualify to final B (non-medal)

Cycling

Road
Italy entered a squad of nine riders (five men and four women) to compete in their respective Olympic road races, by virtue of their top 50 national finish (for men) and top 22 (for women) in the UCI World Ranking.

Men

Women

Track
Following the completion of the 2020 UCI Track Cycling World Championships, Italian riders accumulated spots for both men and women in team pursuit, omnium, and madison, based on their country's results in the final UCI Olympic rankings.

Pursuit

Omnium

Madison

Mountain biking
Italian mountain bikers qualified for four quota places (three men's and one women's) into the Olympic cross-country race, as a result of the nation's runner-up finish for men and ninth for women in the UCI Olympic Ranking List of 16 May 2021.

BMX
Italy received a single quota place for BMX at the Olympics by topping the field of nations vying for qualification in the men's race at the 2019 UCI BMX World Championships.

Race

Diving

Italian divers qualified for three individual spots and two synchronized teams at the Games through the 2019 FINA World Championships and the 2021 FINA Diving World Cup.

Men

Women

Equestrian

Italy fielded a squad of three equestrian riders into the Olympic team eventing competition by securing an outright berth as one of the two top-ranked nations, not yet qualified, at the 2019 European Championships (for Groups A and B) in Luhmühlen, Germany. Meanwhile, one jumping rider was added to the Italian roster by finishing in the top two, outside the group selection, of the individual FEI Olympic Rankings for Groups B (South Western Europe).

Dressage
Following the withdrawal of Norway, Italy received a reallocation to compete in the individual dressage competition.

Qualification Legend: Q = Qualified for the final; q = Qualified for the final as a lucky loser

Eventing
Stefano Brecciaroli and Bolivar Gio Granno have been named the travelling alternates.

Jumping

Fencing

Italian fencers qualified a full squad each in the team foil, team sabre, and the men's team épée at the Games, by finishing among the top four nations in the FIE Olympic Team Rankings, while the women's épée team claimed the spot as the highest-ranked nation from the European zone outside the world's top four. It is the first Olympics ever where Italy will have a team in all events.

The fencing team was officially selected to the Italian roster for the Games on 11 June 2021, with three-time medalist Andrea Cassarà in the men's foil remarkably going to his fifth straight Games. Notable fencers also featured the defending champion Daniele Garozzo in the men's foil, Rio 2016 silver medalist Rossella Fiamingo in the women's épée, and London 2012 silver medalist Arianna Errigo in the women's foil.

Men

 Because of physical injury, Samele could not compete in the semifinal against the Hungarian team and was replaced by Montano, who also competed in the final against South Korea.

Women

Cipressa replaced Batini in the bronze medal match against the American team.

Golf

Italy entered two male and two female golfers into the Olympic tournament. Guido Migliozzi (world no. 72) and Francesco Molinari (world no. 133) qualified directly among the top 60 eligible players for the men's event based on the IGF World Rankings of 20 June 2021. Molinari later withdrew thorough injury and was replaced by Renato Paratore.

Gymnastics

Artistic
Italy fielded a full squad of seven gymnasts (two men and five women) into the Olympic competition. The women's squad finished fifth out of nine nations eligible for qualification in the team all-around to assure its Olympic berth at the 2019 World Artistic Gymnastics Championships in Stuttgart, Germany. On the men's side, Rio 2016 Olympian Ludovico Edalli and rookie Marco Lodadio booked their spots in the individual all-around and apparatus events at the same tournament, with the latter bagging the silver medal in the rings exercise. Vanessa Ferrari initially qualified as an individual; however, Giorgia Villa's injury resulted in Ferrari's placement on the team. As a result, teammate Lara Mori took the individual berth.

Men

Women
Team

 Individual

Rhythmic 
Italy qualified a squad of rhythmic gymnasts for the group all-around by virtue of a top-three finish at the 2018 World Championships in Sofia. Two more rhythmic gymnasts were added to the roster by finishing in the top sixteen of the individual all-around at the 2019 World Championships in Baku, Azerbaijan.

Judo

Men

Women

Mixed

Karate
 
Italy entered five karateka into the inaugural Olympic tournament. 2018 world champion Angelo Crescenzo (men's 67 kg), runner-up Luigi Busà (men's 75 kg), and bronze medalists Mattia Busato (men's kata) and Viviana Bottaro (women's kata) qualified directly for their respective kumite and kata categories by finishing among the top four karateka at the end of the combined WKF Olympic Rankings. Meanwhile, Silvia Semeraro finished second in the final pool round to secure a spot in the women's kumite +61-kg category at the World Olympic Qualification Tournament in Paris, France.

Kumite

Kata

Modern pentathlon

Italian athletes qualified for the following spots to compete in modern pentathlon. Elena Micheli secured her selection in the women's event with a runner-up finish at the 2019 UIPM World Championships in Budapest, Hungary.

Rowing

Italy qualified nine out of fourteen boats for each of the following rowing classes into the Olympic regatta, with the majority of crews confirming Olympic places for their boats at the 2019 FISA World Championships in Ottensheim, Austria.

Men

Women

Qualification Legend: FA=Final A (medal); FB=Final B (non-medal); FC=Final C (non-medal); FD=Final D (non-medal); FE=Final E (non-medal); FF=Final F (non-medal); SA/B=Semifinals A/B; SC/D=Semifinals C/D; SE/F=Semifinals E/F; QF=Quarterfinals; R=Repechage

Sailing

Italian sailors qualified one boat in each of the following classes through the 2018 Sailing World Championships, the individual fleet Worlds, and European qualifying regattas.

On February 19, 2021, the Italian Sailing Federation (FIV) nominated three crews to compete in the rescheduled Tokyo 2020, including Rio 2016 Olympians Silvia Zennaro (women's Laser Radial) and 2018 world champion Ruggero Tita, along with his rookie partner Caterina Banti, in the mixed Nacra 17 catamaran. The women's 470 crew (Berta and Caruso) and Rio 2016 windsurfer Mattia Camboni were officially named to the Italian team on March 19, 2021.

Men

Women

Mixed

M = Medal race; EL = Eliminated – did not advance into the medal race

Shooting

Italian shooters achieved quota places for the following events by virtue of their best finishes at the 2018 ISSF World Championships, the 2019 ISSF World Cup series, European Championships or Games, and European Qualifying Tournament, as long as they obtained a minimum qualifying score (MQS) by May 31, 2020.

On March 2, 2020, the Italian Shotgun Federation officially announced the names of skeet shooters to compete in Tokyo 2020, namely defending champions Gabriele Rossetti and Diana Bacosi, Beijing 2008 gold medalist Chiara Cainero, and rookie Tammaro Cassandro. The rifle and pistol shooters were added to the Italian roster on June 11, 2021, with Marco de Nicolo aiming to collect a single medal at his sixth straight Games.

Men

Women

Mixed

Skateboarding

Italy entered two skateboarders to compete in the men's park at the Games. Ivan Federico and Alessandro Mazzara were automatically selected among the top 16 eligible skateboarders based on the World Skate Olympic Rankings of June 30, 2021.

Softball

Italy women's softball team qualified for the Olympics by winning the gold medal and securing a lone outright berth at the final match of the WBSC Women's Softball Qualifying Event for Europe and Africa in Utrecht, Netherlands.

Summary

Team roster

Group play

Sport climbing

Italy entered three sport climbers into the Olympic tournament. Ludovico Fossali qualified directly for the men's combined event, by advancing to the final and securing one of the seven provisional berths at the 2019 IFSC World Championships in Hachioji, Japan. On the women's side, 18-year-old Laura Rogora finished in the top six of those eligible for qualification at the IFSC World Olympic Qualifying Event in Toulouse, France, earning a quota place and joining with Fossali on the Italian roster. The third and final slot was awarded to Michael Piccolruaz, after accepting an unused berth, as the next highest-ranked sport climber vying for qualification on the men's side at the Worlds.

Surfing

Italy sent one surfer.

Qualification Legend: Q= Qualified directly for the third round; q = Qualified for the second round

Swimming

Italian swimmers further achieved qualifying standards in the following events (up to a maximum of 2 swimmers in each event at the Olympic Qualifying Time (OQT), and potentially 1 at the Olympic Selection Time (OST)): To assure their selection to the Olympic team, swimmers must finish in the top two of the final (or in heat-declared winner races on time for long-distance freestyle) inside the federation's target standards at the 2019 Italian Open Championships (December 12 to 14), 2020 Italian Open Championships (December 17 to 19), 2021 Italian Absolute Championships (March 31 to April 3), and 2021 European Championships in Budapest, Hungary (May 17 to 23).

Men

Women

Mixed

 Swimmers who participated in the heats only.

Table tennis

Italy entered one athlete into the table tennis competition at the Games, marking the country's return to the sport for the first time since London 2012. Debora Vivarelli was automatically selected among the top ten table tennis players vying for qualification in the women's singles based on the ITTF Olympic Rankings of June 1, 2021.

Taekwondo

Italy entered two athletes into the taekwondo competition at the Games for the first time since London 2012. Vito Dell'Aquila qualified directly for the men's flyweight category (58 kg) by finishing among the top five taekwondo practitioners at the end of the WT Olympic Rankings. Meanwhile, 2019 world champion Simone Alessio scored a semifinal victory in the men's welterweight category (80 kg) to book the remaining spot on the Italian taekwondo squad at the 2021 European Qualification Tournament in Sofia, Bulgaria.

Tennis

Italy entered five tennis players (four men and one woman) into the Olympic tournament. Matteo Berrettini (world no. 9), Jannik Sinner (world no. 23), Lorenzo Sonego (world no. 26) and Fabio Fognini (world no. 29), qualified directly for the men's singles as four of the top 56 eligible players in the ATP World Rankings, while Camila Giorgi (world no. 76) did so for the women's singles along with rookie Jasmine Paolini (world no. 87) based on their WTA World Rankings of June 14, 2021. On 3 July, rookie Lorenzo Musetti (world no. 61) replaces Sinner, who withdrew due to personal concerns. On July 18, Matteo Berrettini withdrew due to a thigh injury.

Men

Women

Triathlon

Italy qualified five triathletes (three men and two women) for the following events at the Games by winning the silver medal and securing the first of three available berths at the 2021 ITU Mixed Relay Olympic Qualification Tournament in Lisbon, Portugal.

Individual

Relay

Volleyball

Beach
Italy men's beach volleyball pair qualified for the Games by advancing to the final match and securing an outright berth at the 2019 FIVB World Olympic Qualifying Tournament in Haiyang, China. Another slot was awarded to the Italian female beach volleyball pair by virtue of its top 15 placement in the FIVB Olympic Rankings of 13 June 2021.

Indoor
Summary

Men's tournament

Italy men's volleyball team qualified for the Olympics by securing an outright berth as the highest-ranked nation for pool C at the Intercontinental Olympic Qualification Tournament in Bari.

Team roster

Group play

Quarterfinal

Women's tournament

Italy women's volleyball team qualified for the Olympics by securing an outright berth as the highest-ranked nation for pool F at the Intercontinental Olympic Qualification Tournament in Catania.

Team roster

Group play

Quarterfinal

Water polo

Summary

Men's tournament

Italy men's national water polo team qualified for the Olympics by advancing to the final match and securing an outright berth at the 2019 FINA World Championships in Gwangju, South Korea.

Team roster

Group play

Quarterfinal

5–8th place semifinal

Seventh place game

Weightlifting

Italy entered four weightlifters into the Olympic competition. Mirko Zanni (men's 67 kg), Antonino Pizzolato (men's 81 kg), and Rio 2016 Olympian Giorgia Bordignon (women's 64 kg) secured one of the top eight slots each in their respective weight divisions based on the IWF Absolute World Rankings, with Davide Ruiu  topping the field of weightlifters from the European zone in the men's 61 kg category based on the IWF Absolute Continental Rankings.

Wrestling

Italy qualified two wrestlers for each of the following classes into the Olympic competition. One of them finished among the top six to claim an Olympic slot in the men's freestyle 74 kg at the 2019 World Championships, while an additional license was awarded to the Italian wrestler, who progressed to the top two finals of the men's freestyle 97 kg at the 2021 World Qualification Tournament in Sofia, Bulgaria.

Freestyle

See also
Italy at the 2020 Summer Paralympics

References

Nations at the 2020 Summer Olympics
2020
2021 in Italian sport